Nowe Proboszczewice  is a village in the administrative district of Gmina Stara Biała, within Płock County, Masovian Voivodeship, in east-central Poland.

Geography
The town is located on the Wierzbica River, a tributary of the Skrwa River.
Nowe Proboszczewice is in the municipality of Stara Biala. In the years 1975–1998, the town was administratively part of the Plock province.

The population of the town was 1470 at the 2011 census. is located at  52°39'23?N 19°41'52?E  and the post code is 09-412 .

See also
Old Proboszczewice
Proboszczewice Plockie

References

Nowe Proboszczewice